Duke Island may refer to:

 Duke Island (Alaska)
 Duke Island Park, New Jersey
 Duke Island (lunar mountain)

See also
 La Duke Island, Nunavut, Canada